Transcendence is the second studio album by American heavy metal band Crimson Glory, released in 1988 via Roadracer Records (now Roadrunner Records) in Europe and MCA Records in United States. It is considered by many to be their finest work. It was recorded at Morrisound Studios.

In 2006, Black Lotus Records announced a plan to release a remastered version with a new name, "Transcendence: Renovatio". This was rumoured to feature new cover art, two bonus tracks and more, but Black Lotus ceased operations shortly thereafter and it was never released.

Writing and recording 
"Masque of the Red Death" is about the story written by Edgar Allan Poe. "Eternal World" was written as an instrumental for the tour of the band's first record in the Netherlands.

The drums are a combination of both live and sampled drums. The band sampled drummer Dana Burnell performing live drums into a synclavier without any cymbals, and then re-recorded the cymbals live later in order to have complete separation of drums and cymbals. Guitarist Jon Drenning stated "It was a very arduous and time consuming way to do it but at the time it seemed like something we wanted to try to achieve; a pristine, clean sound and true separation of all instruments."

Artwork 
The front cover artwork was made by Japanese artist Takashi Terada, which was featured on the Japanese poster art for the 1985 science fiction film Lifeforce. Following some of the album's themes of mysticism and divinity, the back cover features a Kabbalistic Tree of Life. This is superimposed by a series of runic letters which, when decoded, spell:
CRIMSON GLORY 
WE WILL STRIKE DOWN THE ONES WHO LEAD US 
WE ARE YOUR FUTURE – WE ARE FOREVER 
TRANSCENDENCE

Reception 

In 2005, Transcendence was ranked number 412 in Rock Hard magazine's book The 500 Greatest Rock & Metal Albums of All Time. Loudwire named it at #15 in their list "Top 25 Power Metal Albums of All Time". ThoughtCo named the album in their list "Essential Power Metal Albums".

Track listing

Personnel 
 Midnight – lead vocals, backing vocals
 Jon Drenning – lead guitar
 Ben Jackson – rhythm guitar
 Jeff Lords – bass guitar
 Dana Burnell – drums

Additional musicians
Jim Morris – synclavier programming
Lex Macar – synclavier programming
John Zahner – additional synthesizer programming
Janelle Sadler – backing vocals (haunting melodies)
Tom Morris – backing vocals (kruschev impression)
Jim Morris – backing vocals (mission commander)
The Killing Crew – backing vocals
The Red Death Mob – backing vocals
The Dragon Beast – backing vocals

Production
Jim Morris – producer, mixing, engineering
Tom Morris – mixing, additional engineering
Judd Packer, Scott Burns, Mike Gowan, John Cervini – assistant engineers
Jon Drenning – artistic direction

References

External links 
 

1988 albums
Crimson Glory albums
Roadrunner Records albums
MCA Records albums
Albums recorded at Morrisound Recording